The Australian cricket team toured India from February to April 2001 for a three-Test series and a five-match ODI series. The series is considered one of India's finest, as they secured victory against Australia in the Test series, in the process breaking Australia's 16-match win streak in Tests, and being the third side to win a Test match after being asked to follow-on during the match in Kolkata. The Kolkata match has been widely regarded as one of the greatest matches in the sport's history.

Background 
The Indian cricket team at the time was depleted, without leading leg spinner Anil Kumble. On the spinning tracks of India, this left them at a disadvantage, with the other spinners who had filled the void during the earlier part of the season being Sunil Joshi, Sarandeep Singh and Murali Kartik, all having played fewer than 10 Tests each.

Harbhajan Singh, whose previous best Test figures were only 3/30, was entrusted with a heavy burden, having been recalled at the behest of captain Sourav Ganguly after previous instances of indiscipline. He was to lead the spin attack against an Australian team which had set a world record with 16 consecutive Test victories, and was searching for its first series victory on Indian soil since 1969. In the first Test, his spinning partner was Rahul Sanghvi, a debutant.

Test series

First Test 

The start of the First Test in Mumbai was overshadowed by the death of Sir Donald Bradman, universally regarded as the greatest batsman in cricket history. After a minute's silence, Australian captain Steve Waugh won the toss and elected to field on a pitch offering assistance to the bowling team. Ganguly stated that he would have done likewise. The Australian fast bowlers quickly removed India's top order, with both openers and Rahul Dravid removed in the first hour's play with only 31 runs scored. After Ganguly was removed with the score on 55, the Indians progressed to be 4/62 at lunch. Sachin Tendulkar lead a counterattack in the hour after lunch, scoring 53 runs in 53 balls to take the score to 4/130 before V. V. S. Laxman was removed. The innings lost momentum when Tendulkar was dismissed for 76 to leave the score at 6/139. India were eventually bowled out in the final session for 176. Shane Warne took 4/47 while Glenn McGrath managed 3/19. In reply, Australia reached 1/49 at stumps, losing Michael Slater.

Australia made steady progress on the second day to reach 1/71, when Harbhajan dismissed Justin Langer. Mark Waugh, the new batsman, was dismissed for a golden duck after Ganguly took a one handed close range diving catch from the next delivery. Sanghvi dismissed Steve Waugh and Harbhajan removed Ricky Ponting for a duck in the following over, to reduce Australia to 5/99 after the first hours play with Harbhajan having taken a spell of 3/8. Australian wicketkeeper Adam Gilchrist, joined opener Matthew Hayden at the crease, who had just reached 50. After the break, Gilchrist lead a counterattack, scoring 36 from 39 balls, and Australia reached lunch at 5/170, having scored 71 runs in the second hour. The pace of the batting increased after lunch, with Gilchrist moving from 50 to 100 in just 29 balls. 96 runs were added in the hour after lunch and after the 197-run partnership ended in 32 overs, Gilchrist and Hayden had scored 122 and 119 respectively. Australia reached 8/329 at tea, compiling 158 runs in the session. A run a ball cameo of 39 from Warne allowed Australia to reach 349, a lead of 173. Harbhajan ended with 4/121. India's top order fared better in the second innings, managing to compile 58 before both openers were lost. they suffered a last scare when wicket-keeper Nayan Mongia, sent in as a nightwatchman was forced to retire hurt after suffering a finger injury, forcing Tendulkar to face the final over of the second day.

India resumed on the third day 115 runs behind, with Tendulkar yet to score and Rahul Dravid having made only six runs from 41 deliveries. They made slow progress, with Dravid taking 41 deliveries to move from six to seven runs. Only 19 runs were scored in the first hour. A further 39 were scored in the second hour before lunch as India concentrated on preserving wickets. Tendulkar counterattacked again after lunch as he did on the first day, with India accumulating 34 runs in seven overs. This ended when a pull shot by Tendulkar from a Mark Waugh long hop hit Langer in the back, who had taken evasive action from his close catching position, and rebounded in the air to be caught by Ponting for 65. After Ganguly was run out for 1, Laxman and Dravid departed in consecutive overs, leaving India at 6/174. Dravid had occupied the crease for 196 balls in compiling 39 runs. The tail was eventually dismissed for 219, with only Mongia's 29 the only other resistance. Tendulkar was the only Indian to pass 50 in the match, and the batting display was epitomised by injured fast bowler Javagal Srinath, who attempted to bat with only one hand and was dismissed without scoring. The other notable event in the Indian innings was a mistimed pull shot from Dravid, which saw an attempted diving catch by Slater. Slater claimed the catch, but Dravid and umpire Srinivas Venkataraghavan disagreed. Slater angrily confronted both men with lengthy verbal outbursts. Australia recorded the 47 runs required for victory without losing a wicket in just seven overs, winning their 16th consecutive Test victory. Ganguly was booed off the ground, and Steve Waugh hailed an "outstanding team performance" by Australia. Gilchrist was named man of the match with 122 and six catches.

Second Test 

{{Test match
| date = 11—15 March 2001
| team1 = 
| team2 = 

| score-team1-inns1 = 445 (131.5 overs)
| runs-team1-inns1 = Steve Waugh 110 (203)
| wickets-team1-inns1 = Harbhajan Singh 7/123 (37.5 overs)

| score-team2-inns1 = 171 (58.1 overs)
| runs-team2-inns1 = VVS Laxman 59 (83)
| wickets-team2-inns1 = Glenn McGrath 4/18 (14 overs)

| score-team1-inns2 = 212 (68.3 overs)
| runs-team1-inns2 = Matthew Hayden 67 (118)
| wickets-team1-inns2 = Harbhajan Singh 6/73 (30.3 overs)

| score-team2-inns2 = 657/7d (178 overs) (f/o)
| runs-team2-inns2 = VVS Laxman 281 (452); Rahul Dravid 180 (353)
| wickets-team2-inns2 = Glenn McGrath 3/103 (39 overs)

| result = India won by 171 runs
| report = Scorecard
| venue = Eden Gardens, Kolkata
| umpires = Shyam Bansal and Peter Willey
| motm = VVS Laxman (Ind)
| toss = Australia won the toss and elected to bat.
| notes = *This was the third time in Test history (the first time for India) that a side won after following on.
}}

With leading paceman Javagal Srinath ruled out of the series with a finger injury during the First Test, the teams met for the Second Test in Kolkata, with an even bigger burden on Harbhajan. Public opinion was sceptical about India's chances of stopping Australia's winning streak, with former captain Bishan Bedi lamenting the demise of Indian cricket. Australia were again in control on the first day, having scored 193/1, with Hayden having struck Harbhajan out of the attack. Harbhajan fought back to reduce Australia to 252/7, taking five wickets in the final session, including Ricky Ponting, Adam Gilchrist and Shane Warne in successive balls to become the first Indian to claim a Test hat-trick. After a prolonged wait for the third umpire to adjudicate whether Sadagoppan Ramesh had managed to catch Warne before the ball hit the ground, the near-capacity crowd at Eden Gardens erupted when he was given out. Harbhajan eventually finished with 7/123 as Australia were bowled out for 445. India batted poorly with Laxman scoring 59 runs, Dravid 25 runs & Ganguly scoring 23 runs and were forced to follow-on after getting allout on 171, trailing by 274 runs. India seemed to be all but out of the match, and the series after McGrath got Ganguly out on 48, with India at 232/4. But then came an epic 376-run partnership between V. V. S. Laxman and Rahul Dravid. The duo batted together for an entire day, unfortunately Laxman got out on 281, missing his triple century & Dravid got out on 180, missing his double century. This allowed India to declared at 657/7, with 383 runs lead, setting Australia an imposing target of 384 to win on the final day. Australia appeared to be safely batting out the match for a draw, until losing 7/56 in the final session, collapsing from 166/3 to be bowled out for 212. Sachin LBW three players and  Harbhajan claimed four of the wickets, to finish with 6/73 for the innings and a match tally of 13/196.  India ended Australia's 16-match world record winning streak, and became only the third team to win a Test after being forced to follow on with Australia having been the losing team on all three occasions.

 Third Test 

The teams arrived in Chennai for the deciding Third Test, and Australia's batsmen again seized control after winning the toss, reaching 340/3 on the second morning.  Then, Australian captain Steve Waugh padded away a delivery from Harbhajan. The ball spun back into Waugh's stumps, who pushed the ball away with his glove, becoming only the sixth batsman in Tests to be given out "handled the ball".  Waugh's dismissal instigated another Australian batting collapse, losing 6 wickets for 51 runs to be bowled out for 391, with Harbhajan taking all six in a spell of 6/26, to finish with 7/133. After India's batsmen gained a first-innings lead of 110, the Australian batsmen were again unable to cope with Harbhajan in the second innings, who took 8/84 to end with match figures of 15/217. India appeared to be heading for an easy victory at 101/2 chasing 155, before losing 6/50 to be 151/8. Perhaps fittingly, Harbhajan walked to the crease, and struck the winning runs.

He was named man of the match and man of the series, having taken 32 wickets in the series, when none of his team-mates managed more than 3.  The Wisden 100 study conducted by Wisden in 2002 rated all four of Harbhajan's efforts in the Second and Third Tests in the top 100 bowling performances of all time, the most for any bowler. He paid tribute to his father, who had died just six months earlier.  His performance led to him usurping Anil Kumble's position as India's first-choice spinner.

ODI series

First ODI

Second ODI

Third ODI

Fourth ODI

Fifth ODI

 Squads 
The following players were in the Indian ODI squad:

The following players represented India in at least one test:Key: *=Captain, †=Wicket-keeper''

References

External links 
Tour website on ESPN CricInfo

2001 in Australian cricket
2001 in Indian cricket
2000-01
Indian cricket seasons from 2000–01
International cricket competitions in 2000–01